The 2012 ICC European Twenty20 Championship Division Three is a cricket tournament that took place between 14 and 16 June 2012. It forms part of the European Cricket Championship. Estonia hosted the event.

Teams
Teams that qualified are as follows:

Squads

Fixtures

Group stage

Points table

Matches

Statistics

Most Runs
The top five run scorers (total runs) are included in this table.

Most Wickets
The top five wicket takers (total wickets) are listed in this table.

See also

 2013 ICC World Twenty20 Qualifier
 European Cricket Championship

References

2014 ICC World Twenty20
European Cricket Championship
2012 in Estonian sport
International cricket competitions in Estonia